The 1997–98 AHL season was the 62nd season of the American Hockey League. The AHL shifts teams in their divisions, and the Canadian division reverts to being named Atlantic division. The Northern conference is renamed the Eastern conference, and the Southern conference renamed the Western conference.

The league introduces three new trophies. The Macgregor Kilpatrick Trophy first awarded for the team which finishes in first place in the league during the regular season. The Yanick Dupre Memorial Award is given to the player who best exemplifies the spirit of community service. The Thomas Ebright Memorial Award honors an individual with outstanding career contributions to the AHL.

Eighteen teams played 80 games each in the schedule. The Philadelphia Phantoms repeated finishing first overall in the regular season, and won their first Calder Cup championship.

Team changes
 The Binghamton Rangers move to Hartford, Connecticut, becoming the Hartford Wolf Pack, playing in the New England division.
 The Carolina Monarchs move to New Haven, Connecticut, becoming the Beast of New Haven, playing in the New England division.
 The Baltimore Bandits move to Cincinnati, becoming the Cincinnati Mighty Ducks, playing in the Mid-Atlantic division.
 The Portland Pirates switch divisions, from New England to Atlantic.
 The Hamilton Bulldogs switch divisions, from Canadian to Empire State.

Final standings
Note: GP = Games played; W = Wins; L = Losses; T = Ties; OTL = Overtime losses; GF = Goals for; GA = Goals against; Pts = Points;

Eastern Conference

Western Conference

Scoring leaders

Note: GP = Games played; G = Goals; A = Assists; Pts = Points; PIM = Penalty minutes

 complete list

Calder Cup playoffs

All Star Classic
The 11th AHL All-Star Game was played on February 11, 1998, at the Onondaga War Memorial in Syracuse, New York. Team Canada defeated Team PlanetUSA 11-10. In the skills competition held the day before the All-Star Game, Team PlanetUSA won 13-8 over Team Canada.

Trophy and award winners

Team awards

Individual awards

Other awards

See also
List of AHL seasons

References
AHL official site
AHL Hall of Fame
HockeyDB

 
American Hockey League seasons
2
2